Inhaminga is an administrative post of Cheringoma District of Sofala Province in Mozambique. It limits to the north and northwest by the district of Caia, on the west by districts of Gorongosa and Maringue, south to Mwanza district, southeast Indian Ocean to the east and northeast and to the district of Marromeu.

Transport 

It is served by a station on the Central railway of Mozambique Railways.

See also 

 Railway stations in Mozambique

References 

Populated places in Sofala Province